Celestin is a masculine given name. Notable people with the name include:

Célestin Freinet
Célestin Montcocol (1879–1981), French businessman
Adolphe Célestin Pégoud (1889-1915), French aviator and first fighter ace in history
 Celestin Tomić (1917–2006), Croatian Franciscan
 Edward Celestin Daly (1894–1964), American prelate
 Friedrich Johannes Jacob Celestin von Schwarzenberg (1809–1885), Austrian cardinal
 Mato Celestin Medović (1857–1920), Croatian painter

Masculine given names
French masculine given names